West Jones High School, the "Home of the Mustangs,"  is a public school in Laurel, Mississippi, part of the Jones County School District. The school provides education to grades 712.

The school was named the state's Tech Prep Exemplary Site for 19752003 by the Tech Prep Exemplary Site Selection Committee.

The school has become the high school of choice for most Jones County parents.  A great academic school with high test scores and a great athletic program.  In recent years, the campus has been renovated with a new Performing Arts Center, a new cafeteria, and new technology systems.

In the 20122013 school year, West Jones High School was classified as a "High Performing School" by the Mississippi Department of Education.

Notable alumni

Stacey E. Pickering (Class of 1986) - State Auditor of Mississippi from 2008 to 2018.

References

Public high schools in Mississippi
Schools in Jones County, Mississippi
Public middle schools in Mississippi